Sachiko Kamo (11 February 1926 — 28 October 2003) was a Japanese tennis player of the 1950s.

Born and raised in Tokyo, Kamo was the second eldest of four tennis siblings, which included Davis Cup representative Kosei Kamo. She won the singles title at the All-Japan tennis championships six times in a row immediately after the war and eight times in total. In 1954 she made history as the first Japanese woman to compete at the Wimbledon Championships and made the singles third round. During the same trip she was the joint singles title winner of the Welsh Championships, with the final abandoned due to rain. She won a gold medal in singles and doubles at the 1958 Asian Games in Tokyo, which was the first time tennis was included on the program.

References

1926 births
2003 deaths
Japanese female tennis players
Asian Games gold medalists for Japan
Asian Games medalists in tennis
Medalists at the 1958 Asian Games
Tennis players at the 1958 Asian Games
Sportspeople from Tokyo
20th-century Japanese women